Anne Valerie Craine  (born 30 April 1954) is a Justice of the Peace from the Isle of Man.

Early life
Craine went to primary school at Dhoon School before attending Ramsey Grammar School after which she studied at St Godric’s Secretarial College in London. Carine served as a justice of the peace in the Isle of Man from 2000–2003. She was elected to the House of Keys at the 2003 by-election for the Keys constituency of Ramsey.

Career
In 2005 she succeeded Phil Gawne as Minister for Agriculture, Fisheries and Forestry. In the island's 2006 General Election, Anne Craine topped the poll in Ramsey. She won 1,969 votes and Allan Bell claimed the second seat in the town with 1,768 votes. Despite having been an MHK for only three years, she saw off tough competition from Leonard Singer, who had resigned as an MLC in order to stand for the Keys, but was unsuccessful with 1,621 votes.

Craine was Minister of Education between 2006 and 2010, and Minister for the Treasury between 2010 and 2011, succeeding Allan Bell from 1 April. In 2011, she lost her Ramsey seat to Leonard Singer.

Governmental positions
Craine had the following posts in the Manx government: While in government she presided over the 27th Commonwealth's Small Countries Conference at the 53rd Commonwealth Parliamentary Conference in Delhi in September 2007.

 Minister for the Treasury, 2010–2011
 Minister of Education, 2006–2010

Personal life
Anne Craine married to David Craine in 1978 and they have two sons and a daughter.

References

External links
 Department of the Treasury - Minister of the Treasury
 Manxradio - General elections 2006 candidate page

Manx women in politics
1954 births
Living people
Members of the House of Keys 2001–2006
Members of the House of Keys 2006–2011
21st-century British women politicians